Aminabad (also Romanized as Amīnābād) is a village in Hablerud Rural District, in the Central District of Firuzkuh County, Tehran Province, Iran. At the 2006 census, its population was 318, in 96 families.

References 

Populated places in Firuzkuh County